Madhumita Bisht (born Madhumita Goswami on 5 October 1964 at Jalpaiguri) is a former badminton player from West Bengal, India. She is an eight-time
National singles champion, nine-time doubles winner and a twelve-time mixed doubles winner. She represented India in the 1992 Olympics in Women's singles discipline.

Awards
She received the Arjuna Award in 1982. 
Madhumita is recipient of the Padma Shri Award (2006).

References

External links
 

1964 births
Living people
People from Jalpaiguri
Sportswomen from West Bengal
Racket sportspeople from West Bengal
Indian female badminton players
Indian national badminton champions
Olympic badminton players of India
Badminton players at the 1992 Summer Olympics
Recipients of the Arjuna Award
Recipients of the Padma Shri in sports
Asian Games medalists in badminton
Badminton players at the 1982 Asian Games
Badminton players at the 1986 Asian Games
Commonwealth Games medallists in badminton
Commonwealth Games bronze medallists for India
20th-century Indian women
20th-century Indian people
Badminton players at the 1998 Commonwealth Games
Badminton players at the 1990 Commonwealth Games
Asian Games bronze medalists for India
Medalists at the 1982 Asian Games
Medallists at the 1998 Commonwealth Games